Charles Elliot Fox  (26 September 1878 – 28 October 1977) was an Anglican missionary and teacher in Melanesia.

Career
Fox was born in Stalbridge, Dorset, England, and educated in New Zealand, graduating Master of Arts from Auckland University College in 1901.  He received a degree in theology from St John's College, Auckland in 1902, joined the Anglican Melanesian Mission in 1903 and was ordained the same year.

Fox co-authored "Beliefs and Tales of San Cristobal" in 1915, which was later printed in the J Royal Anthropological Inst.

Starting around 1924, Fox worked on a dictionary the Lau language of Malaita and one of the Arosi language of Makira in the Solomon Islands,. 

In 1932, Fox declined the post of Bishop of the Melanesian Mission. In the same year he was admitted to the Melanesian Brotherhood.

In the 1974 New Year Honours, Fox was appointed a Commander of the Order of the British Empire, for humanitarian services, particularly in the Solomon Islands. He died in New Zealand in 1977, aged 99 years.

References

Bibliography

External links
 Documents by Fox from Project Canterbury
Charles Elliot Fox Papers MSS 18. Special Collections & Archives, UC San Diego Library.

1878 births
1977 deaths
Anglican saints
People from Stalbridge
New Zealand Anglican priests
New Zealand Anglican missionaries
University of Auckland alumni
20th-century Christian saints
English emigrants to New Zealand
New Zealand Commanders of the Order of the British Empire
Anglican missionaries in the Solomon Islands
Missionary linguists
New Zealand expatriates in the Solomon Islands